This is a list of the most populous islands in Indonesia, sorted from the highest to lowest. This list also includes the respective islands' population density as well as their most populous settlements (all of its population statistics are taken from 2014 data, unless noted as otherwise) and comparisons with other countries and territories.

Only Indonesian territory is counted in divided islands, which are indicated with brackets and italic text after the respective islands' name

See also
 List of Indonesian islands by area

References

Population
Islands by population
Lists by population